The Ponoka Stampeders are a Junior "B" Ice Hockey team based in Ponoka, Alberta, Canada. They are members of the North Division of the Heritage Junior B Hockey League (HJHL). They play their home games at Ponoka Culture & Recreation Complex.

History  

In 1998 the Ponoka Stampeders came into existence in the Heritage Junior B Hockey League.  The name nickname "Stampeders" was adopted from an Alberta Junior Hockey League that played in Ponoka for three seasons, from 1967-68 through 1969-70.

Season-by-season record

Note: GP = Games played, W = Wins, L = Losses, T = Ties, OTL = Overtime Losses, Pts = Points, GF = Goals for, GA = Goals against, PIM = Penalties in minutes

NHL alumni

Jim McCrimmon
Stan Weir
Randy Wyrozub

See also
List of ice hockey teams in Alberta

External links
Official website of the Ponoka Stampeders

Defunct Alberta Junior Hockey League teams
Defunct ice hockey teams in Alberta
Defunct junior ice hockey teams in Canada
Ponoka, Alberta